Events from the year 1431 in Ireland.

Incumbent
Lord: Henry VI

Events
The writing of the Annals of Ulster is begun.

Births

Deaths

References

 
1430s in Ireland
Ireland
Years of the 15th century in Ireland